The wrestling tournament at the 1983 Mediterranean Games was held in Casablanca, Morocco.

Medalists

Freestyle

Greco-Roman

Medal table

References
1983 Mediterranean Games report at the International Committee of Mediterranean Games (CIJM) website
List of Olympians who won medals at the Mediterranean Games at Olympedia.org

Medi
Wrestling
1983